Sir John Hippisley   was an English privateer and politician who sat in the House of Commons at various times between 1621 and 1653. He supported the Parliamentary cause in the English Civil War.

Hippisley was the son of William Hippisley (died 1630). He was knighted at Sheriff Hutton Park on 14 April 1617. 

In 1621, he was elected Member of Parliament for Petersfield. He was re-elected MP for Petersfield in 1624. About this time, he purchased from Sir John Leman the manor of Lesnes and the site of Lesnes Abbey in Bexley which he later sold to Sir Thomas Gainsford, of Crowhurst, Surrey.   In 1624 he was appointed Lieutenant of Dover Castle, a post he held until 1629. He was elected MP for Dover in 1625 and 1626, During his time at Dover he was involved in the wars with France and Spain and took part in privateering activities. In 1628 he was re-elected MP for Dover and sat until 1629 when King Charles decided to rule without parliament for eleven years.

In 1641 Hippisley was elected to the Long Parliament as one of the members elected to the newly enfranchised constituency of Cockermouth. About this time he sold the manor of Marston Bigot to Richard Boyle, 1st Earl of Cork. In the Civil War, Hippisley sided with parliament and was commissioner to treat with the king.

Hippisley married Catherine Norton daughter of Sir Roger Norton.

References

 

Year of birth missing
Year of death missing
English privateers
Roundheads
English MPs 1621–1622
English MPs 1624–1625
English MPs 1625
English MPs 1626
English MPs 1628–1629
English MPs 1640–1648
English MPs 1648–1653
Members of the Parliament of England for Dover